Baugo Township is one of sixteen townships in Elkhart County, Indiana. As of the 2010 census, its population was 9,431.

History
Baugo Township was named from the Baugo Creek, which is derived from the Indian name Baubaugo, meaning "devil river".

Geography

Cities and towns
 Elkhart (southwest edge)

Adjacent townships
 Cleveland Township (north)
 Concord Township (east)
 Harrison Township (southeast)
 Olive Township (south)
 Penn Township, St. Joseph County (west)

Major highways

Cemeteries
The township contains three cemeteries: Noffsinger, Osceola and Saint Vincent Depaul.

References
 
 United States Census Bureau cartographic boundary files

External links
 Indiana Township Association
 United Township Association of Indiana

Townships in Elkhart County, Indiana
Townships in Indiana